This is a list of phonograph manufacturers. The phonograph, in its later forms also called a gramophone, record player or turntable, is a device introduced in 1877 for the mechanical recording and reproduction of sound.

Phonograph manufacturers 

 Abbingdon Music Research
 Acoustic Research
 Acoustic Signature
 Akai  
 Alphason
 AnalogueWorks
 Audio-Technica 
 Bang & Olufsen 
 Bergman
 Birmingham Sound Reproducers aka BSR
 Brinkmann Audio GmbH
 Cambridge Audio
 Clearaudio Electronic 
 Collaro 
 Columbia Graphophone Company
 Columbia Gramophone Company
 Columbia Phonograph Company
 Connoisseur 
 Crosley
 Dansette 
 Denon 
 Dohmann Audio
 Dr. Feickert Analogue
 Dual 
 EMG
 Empire
 Garrard Engineering and Manufacturing Company 
 Gemini Sound Products 
 Goldring 
 Gramophone Company 
 Graphophone
 Grundig 
 Harman Kardon 
 Hitachi
 IGB Eletrônica 
 JBL
 Kimball Phonograph
 Kuzma
 Kyocera
 Langer
 Lenco Turntables 
 Linn Products 
 Logic
 London Decca
 Luxman 
 Luxor 
 Lyric Phonograph Company
 Magnavox
 Michell
 Musical Fidelity 
 NAD Electronics 
 Maplenoll
 Marantz
 Mitsubishi
 Mofi Electronics (Mobile Fidelity Sound Labs)
 Nakamichi 
 National Phonograph Company
 North American Phonograph Company
 Nottingham Analogue Studio
 Numark Industries
 Origin Live 
 Ortofon 
 Onkyo
 Pacific Phonograph Company 
 Panasonic
 Philips 
 Pink Triangle
 Pioneer Corporation 
 Pro-Ject 
 RCA
 Realistic
 Rega Research 
 Roksan Audio 
 Sansui Electric 
 Sanyo
 Silvertone Sold by Sears
 Simon Yorke
 SME Limited 
 Sonora Phonograph Company
 Sony Corporation
 Stanton Magnetics
 TEAC
 TechDAS
 Technics 
 Telefunken
 Tesla
 Thorens
 Transcriptors 
Townshend Audio 
 U-Turn Audio
 Vestax 
 Victor Talking Machine Company
 V-M Corporation - Voice of Music
 VPI Industries 
 Webster-Chicago -Webcor 
 Wagner Audio
 Well Tempered Lab                    
 Wilson Benesch
 Win Laboratories
 Yamaha Corporation 
 Yamaha Pro Audio

By region

United States
In 1890 in the United States, many phonograph companies existed that had state- and region-based names, such as Alabama Phonograph Company, Colorado and Utah Phonograph Company, Kansas Phonograph Company, New England Phonograph Company, etc.

See also

 Phonograph record
 List of bass amplifier and loudspeaker manufacturers
 List of compact disc player manufacturers
 List of loudspeaker manufacturers
 List of microphone manufacturers
 List of record labels
 Nipper the dog

References

Further reading

 

 
Phonograph